Menand Park Historic District is a national historic district located in the village of Menands in Albany County, New York. It includes 21 contributing buildings; all are residences.  The district encompasses an unusual collection of bungalows and Prairie Style houses designed in the period from 1913 to 1925.  Most of them have low sloping roofs with wide overhangs and exposed rafters, recessed porches supported by massive brick or cobblestone piers, and cobblestone or stucco coated chimneys.

It was listed on the National Register of Historic Places in 1985.

References

Houses on the National Register of Historic Places in New York (state)
Historic districts on the National Register of Historic Places in New York (state)
Houses in Albany County, New York
National Register of Historic Places in Albany County, New York